Richard Stuart Dobbs Campbell was Dean of Clonmacnoise from 1904  until 1912.

Campbell was educated at Trinity College, Dublin and was the incumbent at Athlone.

References

Alumni of Trinity College Dublin
Deans of Clonmacnoise
Year of birth missing
Year of death missing